Classification of peripheral nerve injury assists in prognosis and determination of treatment strategy. Classification of nerve injury was described by Seddon in 1943 and by Sunderland in 1951. The lowest degree of nerve injury in which the nerve remains intact but signaling ability is damaged is called neurapraxia. The second degree in which the axon is damaged but the surrounding connecting tissue remains intact is called axonotmesis. The last degree in which both the axon and connective tissue are damaged is called neurotmesis.

Seddon's classification
In 1943, Seddon described three basic types of peripheral nerve injury that include:

Neurapraxia (Class I)

It is a temporary interruption of conduction without loss of axonal continuity. In neurapraxia, there is a physiologic block of nerve conduction in the affected axons.

Other characteristics:
It is the mildest type of peripheral nerve injury.
There are sensory-motor problems distal to the site of injury.
The endoneurium, perineurium, and the epineurium are intact.
There is no wallerian degeneration.
Conduction is intact in the distal segment and proximal segment, but no conduction occurs across the area of injury.
 Recovery of nerve conduction deficit is full, and requires days to weeks.
EMG shows lack of  fibrillation potentials (FP) and positive sharp waves.

Axonotmesis (Class II)

It involves loss of the relative continuity of the axon and its covering of myelin, but preservation of the connective tissue framework of the nerve (the encapsulating tissue, the epineurium and perineurium, are preserved).

Other characteristics:
Wallerian degeneration occurs distal to the site of injury.
There are sensory and motor deficits distal to the site of lesion.
There is no nerve conduction distal to the site of injury (3 to 4 days after injury).
EMG shows  fibrillation potentials (FP), and positive sharp waves (2 to 3 weeks postinjury).
Axonal regeneration occurs and recovery is possible without surgical treatment. Sometimes surgical intervention is required, due to scar tissue formation.

Neurotmesis (Class III)

It is a total severance or disruption of the entire nerve fiber. This includes transection of the axon, endo-, peri-, and epineurium. Neurotmesis may be partial or complete.

Other characteristics:
Wallerian degeneration occurs distal to the site of injury.
There is connective tissue lesion that may be partial or complete.
Sensory-motor problems and autonomic function defect are severe.
There is no nerve conduction distal to the site of injury (3 to 4 days after lesion).
EMG and NCV findings show no distal conduction.
Because of complete transection, surgical intervention is necessary to restore function.

Sunderland's classification
In 1951, Sunderland expanded Seddon's classification to five degrees of peripheral nerve injury:

First-degree (Class I)
Seddon's neurapraxia and first-degree are the same.

Second-degree (Class II)
Seddon's axonotmesis and second-degree are the same. Only the axon is disrupted, with endoneurium intact.

Third-degree (Class II)
Third-degree is included within Seddon's axonotmensis

Sunderland's third-degree is a nerve fiber interruption. In third-degree injury, there is a lesion of the endoneurium, but the epineurium and perineurium remain intact. Recovery from a third-degree injury is possible, but surgical intervention may be required.

Fourth-degree (Class II)
Fourth-degree is included within Seddon's axonotmensis

In fourth-degree injury, only the epineurium remain intact. In this case, surgical repair is required.    

Fifth-degree (Class III)
Fifth-degree is included within Seddon's neurotmesis.

Fifth-degree lesion is a complete transection of the nerve, including the epineurium. Recovery is not possible without an appropriate surgical treatment.

See also

Nerve
Nerve fiber
Peripheral nerve injury (Nerve injury)
Connective tissue in the peripheral nervous system
Neuroregeneration
Wallerian degeneration

References